The 1999/00 FIS Nordic Combined World Cup was the 17th World Cup season, a combination of ski jumping and cross-country skiing organized by FIS. It started on 9 Dec 1999 in Vuokatti, Finland and ended on 17 March 2000 in Val di Fiemme, Italy.

Calendar

Men

Team

Standings

Overall 

Standings after 18 events.

Nations Cup 

Standings after 18 events.

References

External links
FIS Nordic Combined World Cup 1999/00 

1999 in Nordic combined
2000 in Nordic combined
FIS Nordic Combined World Cup